Timothy Patrick McKeegan (26 September 1877 – 19 May 1939) was an Australian rules footballer who played with South Melbourne and Geelong in the Victorian Football League (VFL).

Notes

External links 

1877 births
1939 deaths
Australian rules footballers from Victoria (Australia)
Sydney Swans players
Geelong Football Club players